Archivo Histórico Provincial de Almería (AHPA) is one of the first historical archives established in Spain. In 1980s it was the palace of the Viscounts of Almansa. In 1935 it received the first notarial protocol from Almería, Berja, Canjáyar, Gérgal and Sorbas. It is owned by the Ministerio de Cultura.

References

External links
 

Archives in Spain
History of Almería
1935 establishments in Spain